Perlis State Secretriat Building is Perlis's state secretariat building. It is situated on Jalan Hospital, Kangar.

See also
 State governments in Malaysia

Buildings and structures in Perlis
Kangar
State secretariat buildings in Malaysia